Deep Narayan Sinha  was the Chief Justice of the Calcutta High Court from 1966 to 1970. He was the acting Governor of West Bengal.

References

Governors of West Bengal
Chief Justices of the Calcutta High Court
Possibly living people
Year of birth missing